Vargarna are a Swedish motorcycle speedway team based in Norrköping, Sweden. The team race at the Norrköpings Motorstadion. They ride in the Allsvenskan and are six times champions of Sweden.

History
The name Vargarna literally translates into English as "The Wolves". The team won the Swedish Speedway Team Championship five times 1949, 1951, 1953, 1954, 1960 and 1961.

In recent years the club has moved up and down leagues from the Elitserien to the second tier of Swedish speedway, the Allsvenskan (National League). During the 2022 Swedish Speedway season the club reached the Allsvenskan play off final.

Perhaps the club's most notable rider in recent years was the former world champion Nicki Pedersen, who signed for the team in 2010. He captained the side before leaving the club for Dackarna ahead of the 2014 season.

Season summary

Teams

2022 team

Previous teams

2014 team

 
 
 
 
 
 
 
 
 

2016 team

 
 
 
 

 
 
 
 

 

2018 team

 
 
 
 

 
 
 
 
 

2019 Team

Notable riders

References 

Swedish speedway teams
Sport in Norrköping